Phool Aur Patthar is a 1966 Indian romantic drama film, directed and produced by O. P. Ralhan and written by Ralhan with Akhtar ul Iman and Ahsan Rizvi. It starred Meena Kumari and Dharmendra as contrasting characters who come together; he played a tough criminal (or Patthar, literally a Stone) whose inner good being (or Phool, literally a Flower) is drawn out by Kumari's character of a pure woman. The film made Dharmendra a star in Hindi cinema. The movie also starred Shashikala, Lalita Pawar, Madan Puri and Iftekhar.

This was the movie which went on to become a golden jubilee hit catapulting Dharmendra to stardom. The movie was the highest-grossing for the year 1966. Due to his rugged physique, he was also acknowledged as the He-man of the Indian film Industry. In fact, a scene in the movie where he takes off his shirt to cover the ailing Meena Kumari was one of the highlights of the movie. His performance earned him a nomination in the Best Actor category at the Filmfare awards that year. In the 1960s, it was unusual for the leading man not to sing any songs in a movie. The film was noted for making Dharmendra-Meena Kumari a popular couple and they went on to act in other movies such as Chandan Ka Palna, Majhli Didi and Baharon Ki Manzil after this.

During shooting, at one point of time, Dharmendra had a show-down with the film's director O. P. Ralhan, since he felt that the director had an arrogant attitude and he contemplated quitting the film mid-way. However, better sense prevailed and he resumed shooting.

The film was remade in Tamil as Oli Vilakku, with M. G. Ramachandran, in Telugu as Nindu Manasulu with N. T. Ramarao and in Malayalam as Puthiya Velicham, with Jayan.

Plot
Circumstances have made Shaka a career criminal. When plague empties a town of its inhabitants, he takes the opportunity to burgle a house. He finds nothing except Shanti, a widowed daughter-in-law who has been left to die by her cruel relatives. Shaka nurses her back to health. When her relatives return, they are not pleased to find her alive and even less pleased to discover that someone has tried to rob them. Shanti gets the blame and a beating. Shaka saves her from worse, at the hands of brother-in-law, and the pair flee. They set up home in Shaka's house, much to the displeasure of the respectable neighbours, who are all too ready to think the worst. Shanti's relatives are dismayed when a lawyer arrives to announce that Shanti has been left a legacy. They hatch a plot to get her back. Meanwhile, Shaka's rehabilitation is proceeding - much to the chagrin of his former criminal associates. Fire and redemption for some, death and handcuffs for others is what fate has in store.

Cast
 Meena Kumari as Shanti Devi
 Dharmendra as Shakti Singh / Shaaka
 Shashikala as Rita
 Lalita Pawar as Mrs. Jeevan Ram
 Sunder as Dr. Alopinath - Vaidraj
 Jeevan as Jeevan Ram
 Ram Mohan	as Kalicharan (as Rammohan)
 Manmohan Krishna as Police Inspector
 Madan Puri as John - Boss (as Madanpuri)
 Tun Tun as Mrs. Alopinath (Guddki) (as Tuntun)
 Leela Chitnis as Blind Beggar
 Iftekhar as Babu (as Iftikhar)
 D.K. Sapru as Judge (as Sapru)
 Braham Bharadwaj as Public Prosecutor (as Braham Bharadwaj)
 Baby Farida as Jumni
 Master Aziz as Bablu
 Ram Avtar as Fat Pickpocket
 Bhairon as Daboo - the dog (as Famous Dog Bhairon)
 O. P. Ralhan as Sadakram
 Indira Billi as

Soundtrack
The soundtrack was composed by Ravi and lyrics by Shakeel Badayuni.

Box office
Phool Aur Patthar estimated worldwide box office –  –  ticket sales

India (1966) –  –  ticket sales
Soviet Union (1970) – 11.6 million Rbls – 46.4 million ticket sales

Awards
Filmfare Awards
 Best Art Director - Color - Shanti Dass (Won)
 Best Editor - Vasant Borkar (Won)
 Best Actor - Dharmendra (Nominated)
 Best Actress - Meena Kumari (Nominated)
 Best Supporting Actress - Shashikala (Nominated)

Notes

References

External links 
 
 Phool Aur Patthar on YouTube
1966 films
1960s Hindi-language films
Hindi films remade in other languages
Films scored by Ravi
1960s Urdu-language films
Urdu-language Indian films